Or You Could Kiss Me is a play by Neil Bartlett and Handspring Puppet Company. It received its world première at the National Theatre's Cottesloe venue on 5 October 2010 following previews from 28 September 2010, and played a limited season until 18 November 2010.

Cast

 Adjoa Andoh
 Finn Caldwell
 Basil Jones
 Adrian Kohler
 Craig Leo
 Tommy Luther
 Mervyn Millar

References

External links
National Theatre Production Page
Handspring Puppet Company

2010 plays
British plays